The 6th Genie Awards were held on March 21, 1985, to honour achievements in Canadian cinema in 1984. It was the first time the Genies were broadcast live across Canada by CBC Television, and they drew 1.9 million viewers. The event, held at the Metro Toronto Convention Centre, was cohosted by Al Waxman and Kerrie Keane.

Only four films were nominated for Best Motion Picture this year; two additional films had tied in the voting for the fifth spot, and the Academy of Canadian Cinema and Television opted to nominate only four films rather than extending the category to six nominees. However, similar ties in a few other categories did result in six nominees being named.

Nominees and winners

References

06
Genie
Genie